The year 1989 in television involved some significant events. This is a list of notable events in the United States.

Notable events

Programs

Debuting this year

The following is a list of shows that premiered in 1989.

Resuming this year

Ending this year

Entering syndication

Changing networks

Made-for-TV movies and miniseries

Television stations

Station launches

Stations changing network affiliation

Station closures

Births

Deaths

Television Debuts
William Baldwin – The Preppie Murder
Tim Blake Nelson – The Unnaturals
Michael Chiklis – Miami Vice
Sandra Bullock – Bionic Showdown: The Six Million Dollar Man and the Bionic Woman
Daniel Baldwin – Family Ties
Lea Thompson – Nightbreaker
Robert Patrick – The New Lassie
Faizon Love – L.A. Friday
Isabella Rossellini – The Tracey Ullman Show
Stephen Root – Cross of Fire
Tom Sizemore – Gideon Oliver

See also
 1989 in the United States
 List of American films of 1989

References

External links 
List of 1989 American television series at IMDb

 
1980s in American television